Transcripts of unknown function (TUFs) is the name that has been suggested for known RNA transcripts of DNA whose function is unclear.  Most TUFs are probably ncRNAs, such as RNAi or snoRNAs, but could also represent a whole new class of ncRNA. The DNA sequences for TUFs reside in the intergenic or intronic regions of the genome, which is often called junk DNA.  This currently makes up much of the human genome, although the percentage of the genome that falls under the TUFs category is likely to go down significantly as more progress is made towards understanding the many roles of RNA.

Categories of TUFs 
Broadly speaking, TUFs can be classified into three categories:
 TUFs that are complementary to sense transcripts of protein-coding genes
 TUFs that are novel isoform transcripts of protein-coding genes; this can include expressed pseudogenes
 TUFs that reside on the same strand as protein-coding genes in the intronic region or entirely in the intergenic region

Other information 
There are very few details known about TUFs, which is why the phrase even exists, but one thing that has been shown several times is that they are not very conserved between mice and humans.  This could be due to a number of factors, including more recent evolution in the primate lineage or extensive post-transcriptional modification of the RNA.

References 

Molecular genetics
RNA
Non-coding RNA